Sendai Daikannon, officially known as the Sendai Tendou Byakue Daikannon (仙台天道白衣大観音), is a large statue of Byakue Kannon (白衣観音) bearing a gem in her hand located in Sendai, Japan.

At the time of its completion in 1991, it was the tallest statue in the world, but was surpassed by Ushiku Daibutsu in 1993.

There is a small entry fee to enter the statue itself. Inside on the first floor are many large statues of Buddha and mythical kings. Visitors take an elevator to the 12th level then walk down the stairs and ramps to the ground. At each level there are eight Buddhas displayed in timber cabinets, 108 in all.

See also
 List of tallest statues
 Guanyin of the South Sea
 Cintāmaṇi

References

External links

 Daikannon.com

1991 establishments in Japan
1991 sculptures
Buddha statues in Japan
Buildings and structures completed in 1991
Buildings and structures in Sendai
Colossal Guanyin statues
Colossal statues in Japan
Tourist attractions in Miyagi Prefecture